William Lightbourn Strong (October 18, 1782 – August 31, 1859) was an American pastor.

He was son of Adonijah Strong, and was born in Salisbury, Connecticut, October 18, 1782.  He graduated from Yale University in 1802.  He pursued a course of theological study, and on April 3, 1805, he was ordained and installed Pastor of the church in Somers, Connecticut.  Here he remained until July 2, 1829. After this he was Pastor of the church in Redding, Connecticut for about live years. From Redding he went to Vienna, New York, where in 1835 he was installed Pastor of the Presbyterian Church. The failure of his eyesight obliged him to leave the active duties of the ministry five or six years after this period. He then removed to Fayetteville, New York, where the last twenty years of his life were passed. He was an occasional contributor to the Connecticut Evangelical Magazine, and was the author of several published discourses and of one or two of the tracts issued by the American Tract Society.

He was the father of William Strong and Newton Deming Strong.

He died in Fayetteville, N. Y., August 31, 1859, aged 76.

1782 births
1859 deaths
Yale University alumni
American Presbyterian ministers
People from Salisbury, Connecticut
American male writers
People from Somers, Connecticut
People from Fayetteville, New York